Distant Sky may refer to:

 A 2016 song by Rhapsody of Fire from the album Into the Legend
 A 2016 song by Nick Cave and the Bad Seeds from the album Skeleton Tree